Frank Søholm Grevil (born 1960) is a Danish former intelligence agent. He held the rank of major in Forsvarets Efterretningstjeneste, the  Danish military intelligence agency. On 22 February 2004 he acted as a whistle blower leaking classified information about the FE's assessment of the possibility of weapons of mass destruction in Iraq. The analysis of FE concluded that there was no certain information about operational weapons of mass destruction. This was not aligned with the statement of Danish prime minister Anders Fogh Rasmussen to the Danish parliament that there was evidence that Iraq had weapons of mass destruction.

Information
Frank Grevil was sentenced to four months in jail for leaking these documents.

In 2009, he received the Sam Adams Award for integrity in intelligence which had earlier been given to Katharine Gun and Andrew Wilkie.

In December 2010 Grevil signed a declaration of support for WikiLeaks.
Among others on the list were Daniel Ellsberg and Colleen Rowley.

References

1960 births
Living people
Danish military personnel
Danish whistleblowers
20th-century Danish military personnel
21st-century Danish military personnel